The following lists events that happened during 1875 in Chile.

Incumbents
President of Chile: Federico Errázuriz Zañartu

Events 
date unknown - The Liberal Party (Chile, 1875-1891) is founded.
 16 September Chilean International Exhibition opens

Births
18 March - Manuel Trucco (d. 1931)
12 May - Pedro Pablo Caro (d. 1959)
29 October - Rebeca Matte (d. 1929)

Deaths
23 November - José María de la Cruz (b. 1799)

References 

 
Years of the 19th century in Chile
Chile